The West Antelope Bridge near Flora, North Dakota is a pin-connected Pratt pony truss structure that was built in 1907.  It was listed on the National Register of Historic Places in 1997.

It brings an unpaved, little-maintained county road over the Sheyenne River.

See also
West Park Bridge, also NRHP-listed over the Sheyenne

References

Road bridges on the National Register of Historic Places in North Dakota
Bridges completed in 1907
National Register of Historic Places in Benson County, North Dakota
Pratt truss bridges in the United States
1907 establishments in North Dakota
Transportation in Benson County, North Dakota